Oliphants Drift is a village in Kgatleng District of Botswana. It is located 85 km north-east of Mochudi, close to the border with South Africa. The village has a primary school and a health clinic, and the population was 758 in 2001 census.

References

Kgatleng District
Villages in Botswana